Old Horry County Courthouse, now known as Conway City Hall, is a historic courthouse building located at Conway in Horry County, South Carolina. It was built between 1824 and 1825 and reputedly designed by Robert Mills (1781-1855). It is a two-story Classical Revival brick building. It features an extended pediment supported by Doric order columns that shelters a second story portico which does not extend the full width of the façade.

It was listed on the National Register of Historic Places in 1971.

References

External links
Old Horry County Courthouse - Conway, South Carolina - U.S. National Register of Historic Places on Waymarking.com

Government buildings completed in 1825
Buildings and structures in Conway, South Carolina
Neoclassical architecture in South Carolina
Clock towers in South Carolina
County courthouses in South Carolina
Robert Mills buildings
Courthouses on the National Register of Historic Places in South Carolina
National Register of Historic Places in Horry County, South Carolina